This is the discography of English new wave/synth-pop band China Crisis.

Albums

Studio albums

Live albums

Compilation albums

Video albums

Singles

References

Discographies of British artists
Pop music group discographies
Rock music group discographies
New wave discographies